The 2016–17 Basketball Bundesliga was the 51st season of the Basketball Bundesliga, the top-tier level of professional club basketball in Germany. The season started on 23 September 2016 and ended on 11 June 2017.
The name of the league was changed to easyCredit BBL, after the league signed a sponsor deal until 2021 with easyCredit.

Brose Bamberg won their third straight and ninth overall title.

Teams

Promotion and relegation
Mitteldeutscher BC and Crailsheim Merlins were relegated from the BBL after the 2015–16 season, as they finished in the last two places. Science City Jena and Rasta Vechta were promoted from the 2015–16 ProA. Science City were the champions of the second division, Vechta the runners-up.

Arenas and locations

Regular season

Standings

Results

Playoffs

The playoffs started on 5 May and ended on 11 June 2017. In all rounds a best-of-five playoff format was used.

Awards
Most Valuable Player
 Raymar Morgan, ratiopharm Ulm
Best Offensive Player
 Raymar Morgan, ratiopharm Ulm
Best Defender
 Daniel Theis, Brose Bamberg
Best German Young Player
 İsmet Akpınar, Alba Berlin
Coach of the Year
 Thorsten Leibenath, ratiopharm Ulm
Most Effective Players
 Maxi Kleber, Bayern Munich
 Raymar Morgan, ratiopharm Ulm

All-BBL Teams

All-Star Game
The 2017 All-Star Game was played in Bonn on January 14, 2017. Team International beat Team National 102–99 in the Telekom Dome, Philipp Schwethelm was named MVP.

Average attendances
Attendances include playoffs games and matches played against Phoenix Hagen.

See also
2016–17 ProA
2016–17 ProB

References

External links
Official website 

Basketball Bundesliga seasons
German
1